Brian Leung may refer to:
 Brian Leung Kai-ping, a Hong Kong activist who removed his mask during the storming of the Hong Kong Legislative Council Complex on the night of 1–2 July 2019
 Brian Leung Siu Fai (born 1964), Hong Kong radio disc jockey and presenter
 Brian Leung Hung Tak, chairperson of Hong Kong Football Association
 Brian Leung (author), American writer